Kevin Arthur Ohme (born April 13, 1971) is a former Major League Baseball pitcher. In 2 career games, he had a 0–0 record, with a 0.00 ERA. He pitched in 4.1 innings in his 2 career games, with 2 strikeouts. He batted and threw left-handed, and a hit in his only MLB at-bat gave him a rare career batting average of 1.000.

Ohme was drafted by the Minnesota Twins in the 9th round of the 1993 amateur draft.

He also played in Japan's Nippon Professional Baseball, in 2000 and 2001, with the Nippon-Ham Fighters.

External links

1971 births
Living people
St. Louis Cardinals players
Major League Baseball pitchers
Baseball players from Florida
Nippon Ham Fighters players
Indian River State Pioneers baseball players
American expatriate baseball players in Japan
Sportspeople from Palm Beach, Florida
Fort Wayne Wizards players
Hardware City Rock Cats players
Memphis Redbirds players
Salt Lake Buzz players